Wyoming Highway 213 (WYO 213) is a  state highway in the eastern part of Laramie County, Wyoming, named Burns Road, that provides travel between Interstate 80/U.S. Highway 30 and the Town of Burns and north to WYO 216 and US 85.

Route description 
Wyoming Highway 213 begins its south end at an interchange with Interstate 80/US 30 at exit 386, which is also the northern terminus of Wyoming Highway 214. Historically, WYO 213 turned west and traveled along the I-80 Service Road for half a mile before turning north onto Burns Road into Burns. WYO 213 used to end at Burns, but was extended in 2009 north to U.S. Route 85, seven miles south of Meriden. Since 2012, Wyoming Highway 213 has been rerouted out of the Burns town center and over a $6.6 million railway overpass just east of the town, avoiding an at-grade crossing.

Major intersections

See also

 List of state highways in Wyoming

References

External links

 Wyoming Highways 200-299
 WYO 213 - I-80/US-30/WYO 214 to Burns & extension to US 85

Transportation in Laramie County, Wyoming
213